Iran participated in the 1999 Asian Winter Games held in Kangwon, South Korea from January 30, 1999 to February 6, 1999.

Competitors

Results by event

Skiing

Alpine

Men

Women

Cross-country

Men

References

External links
 Official Website of the 4th Winter Asian Games

Asian Winter Games
Nations at the 1999 Asian Winter Games
1999